Flax semilongus is a moth of the family Erebidae first described by Michael Fibiger in 2011. It is found in the Philippines (Palawan).

The wingspan is about 10 mm. The ground colour of the forewings (including fringes) is light brown and the subterminal and terminal areas are brown. The base of the costa is dark brown. There is a dark brown quadrangular patch in the upper medial area, with a black dot in the inner lower area. The crosslines are indistinct and brown. The terminal line is only indicated by dark brown interveinal dots. The hindwings are light grey. The underside of the forewings is unicolorous light brown and the underside of the hindwings is grey with a discal spot.

References

Micronoctuini
Moths described in 2011
Taxa named by Michael Fibiger